Thambi Pondatti is a 1992 Indian Tamil-language drama film, directed by Kunchu Arunachalam. The film stars Rahman, Sukanya, Nizhalgal Ravi and Ramya Krishnan. It was released on 7 February 1992.

Plot

Somu (Rahman) is an advertising photographer who exclusively works with female models. His family is a very modern family. His elder brother Balu (Nizhalgal Ravi) falls in love with his friend Maala (Ramya Krishnan), a modern woman, and he discloses it to Somu. They finally get married. Thereafter, the entire family searches for a bride for Somu. In turn, Somu gets married with Sumathi (Sukanya), who is from a strict conservative family. Sumathi becomes a suspicious wife and she finds her husband's family's behaviours irritating. What transpires later forms the crux of the story.

Cast

Rahman as Somu
Sukanya as Sumathi
Nizhalgal Ravi as Balu
Ramya Krishnan as Maala
Nagesh as Nivas
Rajesh as Chellappa
Vivek as Mani
Sulakshana as Parvathi
Kavitha as Lakshmi
R. N. K. Prasanth
Crazy Mohan
Jayamkondan
Vijaya Chandrika
M. Bhanumathi
Baby Sowmya
Baby Thenu
Rajendran as henchman (uncredited)

Soundtrack

The film score and the soundtrack were composed by Ilaiyaraaja. The soundtrack, released in 1992, features 5 tracks, with lyrics written by Panchu Arunachalam, Ilaiyaraaja and Gangai Amaran.

References

1992 films
Films scored by Ilaiyaraaja
1990s Tamil-language films
Films directed by Panchu Arunachalam